Sardar Azmoun ( (Sardâr Âzmôn); born 1 January 1995) is an Iranian professional footballer who plays as a forward for Bundesliga club Bayer Leverkusen and the Iran national team.

Azmoun made his debut for the Iran national team in 2014 aged 19. He has been a regular with Team Melli playing in the 2015 and 2019 AFC Asian Cup as well as the 2018 FIFA World Cup.

After Alireza Jahanbakhsh, Azmoun is the second-most expensive Iranian player of all-time. He is the youngest Iranian to score in a UEFA Champions League game.

Club career

Early years
According to Sardar, he was first introduced to the sport when he started to kick balls on a family trip in Turkmenistan when he was 9. He began his career at Oghab Gonbad of Gonbad-e Kavus. He also played volleyball and was invited to Iran's national under-15 volleyball team. After some years, he joined Shamoushak Gorgan, before joining Etka Gorgan, who were playing in Division 1 (the second tier) in Iran at the time.

Sepahan
At age 15, Azmoun joined Sepahan's youth ranks. While he appeared for the club during their pre-season friendlies abroad in Turkey, he did not make a professional appearance for the club as Sepahan won the 2011–12 Iran Pro League and lifted the trophy.

During the 2012–13 season, thanks to Azmoun's great display in Iran's youth team, Sardar became sought after by a couple of European clubs, namely Rubin Kazan. Azmoun became Iran's youngest Legionnaire when later that year he transferred to Rubin Kazan at the age of 17.

Rubin Kazan

2012–13 season
In January 2013, Azmoun received an offer from Russian team Rubin Kazan to join them; meanwhile he had interest from two Iranian teams, Persepolis and Esteghlal, as well as an offer for first team contract in Sepahan. He chose to work with Turkmen speaking Kurban Berdyev and became Iran's first football player in the Russian Premier League. In his first season at the club, he made 8 appearances for his club's reserve team, scoring two goals and receiving one yellow card. He was also picked for the 18-man match day squad on a number of occasions, but failed to make his senior debut.

2013–14 season

On 25 July 2013, Azmoun made his debut for the senior team in a UEFA Europa League match against Jagodina, coming on as a 73rd-minute substitute as Rubin won 1–0. On 29 August, he scored his first goal in just his second senior appearance for Rubin in a 3–0 Europa League win against Molde, coming on as a substitute in the 64th minute. He made his league debut with a goal and an assist on 6 October 2013, coming on as a substitute in the 72nd minute in a 5–1 win over Anzhi Makhachkala.

On 27 March 2014, English Premier League side Arsenal reportedly made a £2 million offer to Kazan for the transfer of 19-year-old Azmoun, sparking interest from A.C. Milan, Juventus, Liverpool, Tottenham, and Barcelona as well.

Three days later, he scored his second league goal for Rubin Kazan in a 2–1 defeat to Rostov. On 6 April, he scored a goal in Rubin Kazan's defeat to Zenit St. Petersburg. In a match against Krylia Sovetov on 10 May, Azmoun came on as a substitute in the 55th minute, scoring a goal and providing an assist in a 4–0 win.

2014–15 season
On 4 July 2014, Rubin Kazan announced through their official website that Azmoun would remain at the club despite transfer offers from Arsenal, Liverpool and Zenit St. Petersburg. He scored Rubin Kazan's goal in a 1–1 draw against Hellas Verona in a pre-season friendly match on 27 July 2014. He scored his first goal of the season in a 1–1 draw against Terek Grozny in the 87th minute. On 30 October, he scored a goal in their victory over Spartak Moscow in the 2014–15 Russian Cup.

Rostov

On 26 February 2015, Azmoun signed a three-and-a-half-month loan deal with relegation-battling Russian Premier League club FC Rostov until the end of the season. On 16 March, Azmoun came on as a substitute in the 73rd minute and scored the match winner in the 88th minute against Kuban Krasnodar. Azmoun again found the back of the net on 26 April 2015 in Rostov's 2–2 draw against Dynamo Moscow. His good performance earned him a place on the Russian Premier League Team of the Week. He scored Rostov's winning goal in the relegation play-offs on 7 June.

2015–16 season
At the end of the 2014–15 season, Azmoun extended his loan deal with Rostov until the end of the 2015–16 season. He scored his first goal of the season on 22 August 2015 in a 2–1 loss to CSKA Moscow. After his good performances in the first half of the season, he was linked with English Premier League club Stoke City. Later in March 2016 he was also linked with a move to English side Everton.

After a long goalless drought, Azmoun scored in Rostov's 3–0 win against Zenit Saint Petersburg on 24 April 2016. He scored a brace in a 3–1 victory over Dynamo Moscow on 12 May 2016, which kept Rostov in second place and in contention for the Russian Premier League championship. On 16 May 2016 with his goal, Rostov defeated Ural 1–0 and clinched at least an UEFA Champions League play–off spot for the 2016–17 season. His goal against Ural was his fifth consecutive game with a goal which included 6 goals in 5 games.

On the last day of the Russian Premier League on 21 May 2016 needing a win and CSKA Moscow to drop points to become champions, Azmoun assisted Rostov's first goal in their 2–0 win against Terek Grozny. However, CSKA won their match and Rostov finished as runners up, thus securing a UEFA Champions League playoff spot.

Azmoun finished seventh in league scoring with nine goals, despite getting half as much playing time as some other top scorers. He was also voted as the fifth most valuable player of the league, narrowly behind players such as Fyodor Smolov, Moussa Doumbia, and Brazilian superstar Hulk.

2016–17 season

Initially it was announced that Azmoun would return to Rubin Kazan. However, Rostov triggered the buy out clause in Azmoun's contract. Rubin Kazan denied this clause and claimed Azmoun was their player. Rubin lodged a complaint with FIFA. FC Rostov filed a counter-complaint with the Court of Arbitration for Sport, and on 22 July 2016 CAS temporarily ruled in favour of Azmoun and he was included in Rostov's UEFA Champions League squad. According to Rostov's lawyer Yuri Zaytsev, the final CAS decision on his status might not be reached until late 2016 or even the summer of 2017.

Azmoun made his Champions League debut on 26 July 2016 in the first leg of a third-round qualifying round match against Anderlecht at Olimp – 2, coming on for Aleksandr Bukharov at the 56th minute. He started in the return leg on 3 August 2016 and scored his first Champions League goal in the 47th minute, helping Rostov advance 4–2 on aggregate. He scored his second Champions League goal on 24 August 2016 in the return leg of the playoff round match against Ajax, scoring the opening goal in a 4–1 victory which resulted in Rostov advancing to the group stage of the Champions League for the first time. Azmoun scored on 1 November 2016 in a Rostov's 2–1 Champions League group stage loss against Atlético Madrid. In the process, he became the first Iranian to score in the Champions League group stage since Ali Karimi in 2005. On 23 November 2016, Azmoun scored his second Champions League goal in the group stage against Bayern Munich at home, leading Rostov to a 3–2 victory and their first ever official Champions League group stage win.

After his good performances and goals in the UEFA Champions League, Azmoun drew interest from European giants such as Marseille, Liverpool, Arsenal, Borussia Dortmund, and Bayer Leverkusen.

On 6 November 2016, Azmoun scored his first Russian Premier League goal of the 2016–17 season in a 4–1 victory. He scored his second goal of the season on 28 November against Anzhi Makhachkala. On 26 January 2017, FIFA rejected appeals by Rubin Kazan related to Azmoun's transfer to Rostov and ruled that there were no obligations outstanding towards Rubin. On 3 March 2017, in the first league game after the end of the winter break, Azmoun scored twice in a 6–0 victory against FC Tom Tomsk. He scored another brace against his former side Rubin Kazan.

After the end of the 2016–17 season, Azmoun received interest from Scottish side Celtic, English Premier League club Everton, and La Liga side Valencia.

Return to Rubin Kazan

In June 2017, Azmoun returned to Rubin Kazan. He appeared in a friendly on 28 June 2017 as a second-half substitute, wearing number 69. FC Rostov confirmed the transfer agreement with Rubin on 14 July 2017.

Zenit Saint Petersburg
On 1 February 2019, he signed a 3.5-year contract with Zenit St. Petersburg. Sardar scored two goals and registered one assist in his debut start for Zenit against Fenerbahçe in the Round of 32 in the UEFA Europa League. He was chosen as the Player of the Week for his outstanding performance by UEFA. On 2 March 2019, he scored the only goal of the game to give Zenit a 1–0 victory over FC Ural Yekaterinburg in his Russian Premier League debut for the team. On 31 March 2019, in a home game he doubled against FC Orenburg. On 17 September 2019, Azmoun scored the first goal of the 2019–20 UEFA Champions League group stage in his Champions League debut for Zenit against Olympique Lyonnais. With a goal against Benfica in the following match, he surpassed Mehdi Mahdavikia and Ali Daei to become the most prolific Iranian goal scorer in the UEFA Champions League with four goals.

On 5 July 2020, he scored twice in a 4–2 victory over FC Krasnodar that secured a second consecutive Russian Premier League title for Zenit. On 22 July 2020, the last day of the 2019–20 Russian Premier League season, he scored his 17th goal in the league to finish as co-top scorer of the league with his teammate Artem Dzyuba.

On 2 May 2021, he scored a hat-trick to bring his league season scoring total to 19, as Zenit secured their third title in a row in a 6–1 victory over second-place FC Lokomotiv Moscow. He was overtaken as the league top scorer by his teammate Artem Dzyuba in the last game of the season on 16 May 2021 when Dzyuba scored four to bring his total to 20. He was voted RPL Player of the Season for the 2020–21 Russian Premier League season.

Bayer Leverkusen 
On 22 January 2022, Bundesliga club Bayer Leverkusen announced that Azmoun had signed a pre-contract to join the club on a free transfer on 1 July 2022. He signed a five-year contract with Die Werkself. On 30 January, Zenit announced that the clubs have agreed on a winter transfer and Azmoun would move to Bayer Leverkusen immediately.

International career

Youth
Azmoun broke out while representing the Iran U-20 side when he was first called up for the 2012 AFF U-19 Youth Championship, becoming the top scorer of the tournament before repeating the feat in the 2012 Commonwealth of Independent States Cup, scoring seven goals in six games. On 8 October 2013, he played for the U-20 team during the 2014 AFC U-19 Championship qualification in Kerman. In a match against Lebanon, he captained the team by scoring two goals, assisting one and drawing a penalty.

Azmoun was called into the U-23's team for Olympic qualifiers in March 2015. He was the tournament's leading goalscorer going into the final matchday with 4 goals in 3 matches. As the 2016 AFC U-23 Championship was not held during the FIFA International Match Calendar, he was not released by Rostov.

Senior
On 5 October 2013, Azmoun was called up to the Iranian national football team against Thailand by Carlos Queiroz. He was selected in Iran's 28-man provisional squad for the 2014 FIFA World Cup by Queiroz but was one of five players being dropped from the final squad.

Azmoun made his senior debut on 26 May 2014 in a friendly match against Montenegro, coming on as a substitute in the 60th minute for Reza Ghoochannejhad. However, he was not included in Iran's squad for the 2014 FIFA World Cup, announced on 1 June 2014. He scored his first goal on 18 November 2014 in a 1–0 friendly win over South Korea.
Azmoun was called into Iran's 2015 AFC Asian Cup squad on 30 December 2014 by Carlos Queiroz. He scored a goal in the next match, a 1–0 friendly win over rivals Iraq. He then scored the winner in the second game of the Asian Cup with a great piece of individual skill against Qatar. He also opened the scoring against Iraq in the quarter-finals with a header.

On 16 June 2015, Azmoun scored a goal against Turkmenistan in a 2018 FIFA World Cup qualifier. On 3 September 2015, he scored his first senior brace in a 6–0 defeat of Guam in the World Cup qualifiers. He scored his first hat-trick for Iranian national team in 3–0 win over Macedonia at Philip II Arena on 2 June 2016. Eight days later, he scored the first goal in Iran's 2–0 win over Uzbekistan which secured qualification to the 2018 FIFA World Cup. In June 2018 he was named in Iran's final squad for the 2018 World Cup in Russia. He made his first World Cup appearance in a 1–0 victory over Morocco in their first group stage match on 15 June.

Azmoun retired from International football at the age of 23 just after Iran's 2018 World Cup exit due to insults he received from fans, which, he said, had caused his mother's illness to worsen. Azmoun chose to retire to be by his mother's side.

In October 2018, Azmoun returned to the Iranian national team and was called up for 2019 AFC Asian Cup by Carlos Queiroz.

During the 2022 Mahsa Amini protests, Azmoun took a public stance against the Iranian government. He indicated his public views could cost him the ability to play in the World Cup, but he said "That is worth sacrificing for one strand of Iranian women's hair". He was nevertheless allowed to play in a friendly against Senegal, at which he scored an equalizing goal which he declined to celebrate.

Style of play
Azmoun has been praised for his aerial ability, creativity, and bursts of acceleration. He has been referred to as a young Zlatan Ibrahimović and has also been called the Iranian Messi by mainly British media.

Azmoun has also been touted to be the heir of legendary Iranian striker Ali Daei.

Personal life
Azmoun was born into a Sunni family of Turkmen origin. He speaks Persian, Turkmen, Turkish, English and Russian fluently, and is fond of riding on horseback. He communicated with Kurban Berdyev, his Turkmenistani coach at FC Rubin Kazan and FC Rostov, in Turkmen. He decided to wear number 69 at Kazan as a tribute to his hometown's vehicle registration plate. Azmoun has stated he is a supporter of Spanish club Real Madrid. Azmoun has also stated that playing for Fenerbahçe is his childhood dream.

He is the son of Khalil Azmoun, a former Iranian national volleyball team player who has coached several volleyball teams, such as Golgohar Sirjan and Javaheri Gonbad VC.

Azmoun decided to retire from International football at the age of 23 just after Iran's 2018 World Cup exit due to heavy criticism he faced from fans, as the criticism caused his mother's illness to worsen. As a result, Azmoun chose to retire to be by his mother's side. He has returned to the team after taking this break.

Azmoun is a member of the Humanitarian Association of World Turkmens.

Sporting interests
Outside of his footballing life, Azmoun is a keen equestrian, and is active in thoroughbred horse racing and breeding. He owns the Serik Horse Complex, a major horse racing and breeding complex based in his hometown of Gonbad-e Kavus. In a February 2022 interview Azmoun said that he owns 52 horses. In 2020, he bought the Australian thoroughbred horse Serlik for $500,000; Serlik is trained by Australian jockey Michelle Payne. In 2021, Azmoun bought a second Australian horse for $70,000, a Palentino colt also to be trained by Payne.

Azmoun is also the owner of Serik Gonbad Kavus Women's Volleyball Club in Iran. As of the 2022–23 season, the team will participate in Iran Women's Volleyball Premier League.

Career statistics

Club

International

Scores and results list Iran's goal tally first, score column indicates score after each Azmoun goal.

Youth level 
Under-17

Under-20

Under-23

Honours
Zenit Saint Petersburg
Russian Premier League: 2018–19, 2019–20, 2020–21, 2021–22
Russian Cup: 2019–20
Russian Super Cup: 2020, 2021

Iran U17
WAFF U-15 Championship: 2009

Iran U20
AFF U-19 Youth Championship: 2012

Individual
CIS Cup top goalscorer: 2012
 AFC Asian Cup Team of the Tournament: 2019
RFS Team of the Season: 2019–20, 2020–21
Russian Premier League Player of the Season: 2020–21
Russian Premier League Player of the Month: March 2019
Russian Premier League top goalscorer: 2019–20
IFFHS Asian Men's Team of the Year: 2020

References

External links

 
 
 
 

1995 births
Living people
Iranian Turkmen people
People from Gonbad-e Qabus
Iranian footballers
Association football forwards
Association football wingers
Iran international footballers
Iran youth international footballers
2015 AFC Asian Cup players
2018 FIFA World Cup players
2019 AFC Asian Cup players
Sepahan S.C. footballers
FC Rubin Kazan players
FC Rostov players
FC Zenit Saint Petersburg players
Bayer 04 Leverkusen players
Russian Premier League players
Bundesliga players
Iranian expatriate footballers
Iranian expatriate sportspeople in Russia
Iranian expatriate sportspeople in Germany
Expatriate footballers in Russia
Expatriate footballers in Germany
2022 FIFA World Cup players